The 1986 Cheltenham Council election took place on 8 May 1986 to elect members of Cheltenham Borough Council in Gloucestershire, England. One third of the council was up for election. The SDP–Liberal Alliance made gains but fell one seat short of a majority, meaning the council stayed in no overall control.

After the election, the composition of the council was
SDP–Liberal Alliance 16
Conservative 11
Residents Associations 4
Labour 2

Election result

Ward results

References

Cheltenham
Cheltenham Borough Council elections
1980s in Gloucestershire